Mark Dewayne Lovell (born July 1, 1958) is an American former politician in the state of Tennessee. He served in the Tennessee House of Representatives from 2010 to 2017, sitting as a Republican. He resigned in February 2017 amidst allegations of inappropriate sexual contact.

References

Living people
Republican Party members of the Tennessee House of Representatives
1958 births